The 1996–97 Segunda División season saw 20 teams participate in the second flight Spanish league. CP Mérida, UD Salamanca and RCD Mallorca were promoted to Primera División. Almería CF, Real Madrid B, Barcelona B and Écija were relegated to Segunda División B.

Teams

Teams by Autonomous Community

Final table

Results

Promotion playoff

First Leg

Second Leg 

Segunda División seasons
2
Spain